Grevillea singuliflora is a species of flowering plant in the family Proteaceae and is endemic to southeast Queensland. It is a sprawling or spreading shrub with oblong to egg-shaped or almost round leaves and green or cream-coloured flowers with a maroon style, arranged singly or in pairs on the ends of branches.

Description
The flowers are green or cream-coloured, the style moroon with a green tip.

Taxonomy
Grevillea singuliflora was first formally described in 1867 by Ferdinand von Mueller in Fragmenta Phytographiae Australiae from specimens collected by Ludwig Leichhardt near Dogwood Creek. The specific epithet (singuliflora) means "single-flowered".

Distribution and habitat
The grevillea occurs in scattered populations from Helidon to the Blackdown Tableland in southeast Queensland. It grows on sandy soils, usually close to watercourses, in open dry eucalypt forest.

Conservation status
Grevillea singuliflora is listed as of "least concern" under the Queensland Government Nature Conservation Act 1992.

References

singuliflora
Proteales of Australia
Endemic flora of Australia
Flora of Queensland
Taxa named by Ferdinand von Mueller
Plants described in 1867